The  is a skyscraper located in Akita City, Akita, Japan. Construction of the 95-metre, 30-storey skyscraper was finished in 2003.
There was a Kyodosha department store in this place.

External links

Location map

Buildings and structures completed in 2007
Buildings and structures in Akita (city)
Skyscrapers in Japan
2007 establishments in Japan